The City of Cherry Hills Village is a home rule municipality located in Arapahoe County, Colorado, United States. The city population was 6,442 at the 2020 United States Census. Cherry Hills Village is a part of the Denver–Aurora–Lakewood, CO Metropolitan Statistical Area and the Front Range Urban Corridor.

The city hosted two PGA Championships (1941 and 1985) and the 2005 U.S. Women's Open at the Cherry Hills Country Club.

The community was named for a grove of cherry trees near the original town site. On April 16, 2019, the city council voted to rename the 111-year old Swastika Acres subdivision as "Old Cherry Hills".

Geography
Cherry Hills Village is located at  (39.637437, -104.947452).

At the 2020 United States Census, the city had a total area of  including  of water.

Education
The majority of Cherry Hills Village is in Cherry Creek School District. Portions are in Englewood Schools.
Cherry Hills Village Elementary School, One of the many elementary schools that is a part of the Cherry Creek district

Private schools:
St. Mary's Academy, an all-girls' high school, which counts former Secretary of State Condoleezza Rice among its alumni
Kent Denver School, which counts former Secretary of State Madeleine Albright among its alumni

Demographics

As of the census of 2000, there were 5,958 people, 1,980 households, and 1,766 families residing in the city. The racial makeup of the city was 96.06% White, 0.64% African American, 0.15% Native American, 1.51% Asian, 0.57% from other races, and 1.07% from two or more races. Hispanic or Latino of any race were 1.88% of the population.

There were 1,980 households, out of which 45.8% had children under the age of 18 living with them, 84.0% were married couples living together, 3.5% had a female householder with no husband present, and 10.8% were non-families. 9.1% of all households were made up of individuals, and 5.3% had someone living alone who was 65 years of age or older.  The average household size was 3.01 and the average family size was 3.20.

In the city, the population was spread out, with 31.4% under the age of 18, 3.9% from 18 to 24, 17.1% from 25 to 44, 35.0% from 45 to 64, and 12.6% who were 65 years of age or older.  The median age was 44 years. For every 100 females, there were 100.7 males.  For every 100 females age 18 and over, there were 98.8 males.

The median income for a household in the city was $190,805, and the median income for a family was $200,001. Males had a median income of $100,000+ versus $49,891 for females. The per-capita income for the city was $99,996. About 1.7% of families and 2.2% of the population were below the poverty line, including 3.5% of those under age 18 and 1.5% of those age 65 or over.

Median resident age: 43.8 years
Median household income: $232,492 (year 2000)  Cherry Hills 
Median house value: $1,193,000 (year 2005)
Average Price per Square Foot: $369 (October 2017)

Educational Background for population 25 years and over in Cherry Hills Village:

 High school or higher: 97.8%
 Bachelor's degree or higher: 75.2%
 Graduate or professional degree: 37.5%

Marital Status for population 15 years and over in Cherry Hills Village:

 Never married: 19.2%
 Now married: 74.9%
 Separated: 0.1%
 Widowed: 2.7%
 Divorced: 3.1%

Notable people
Notable individuals who were born in or have lived in Cherry Hills Village include:
 Merle Chambers (1946- ), lawyer, business executive, and philanthropist 
 Peter H. Dominick (1915-1981), former U.S. Senator from Colorado
 David Duval (1971- ), golfer
 John Elway (1960-), NFL quarterback/executive 
 Peyton Manning (1976- ), NFL quarterback
Rebecca Love Kourlis (1952-), former justice of Colorado Supreme Court
 Ethel Merman (1908-1984), American entertainer
 Joe Sakic (1969-), former National Hockey League (NHL) player, current NHL executive
 Mike Shanahan (1952-), National Football League (NFL) coach
 Russell Wilson (1988-), National Football League (NFL) quarterback

See also

Colorado
Bibliography of Colorado
Index of Colorado-related articles
Outline of Colorado
List of counties in Colorado
List of municipalities in Colorado
List of places in Colorado
List of statistical areas in Colorado
Front Range Urban Corridor
North Central Colorado Urban Area
Denver-Aurora, CO Combined Statistical Area
Denver-Aurora-Lakewood, CO Metropolitan Statistical Area

References

External links

City of Cherry Hills Village official website
CDOT map of the City of Cherry Hills Village

Cities in Arapahoe County, Colorado
Cities in Colorado
Denver metropolitan area
1945 establishments in Colorado